Camino a Marte is a 2017 Mexican film directed by Humberto Hinojosa. The film starred by Luis Gerardo Méndez, Camila Sodi and Tessa Ia. The film premiered on December 1, 2017 in Mexico.

Plot 
Emilia (Tessa Ia) is a young woman who has cancer and only a few days left to live. A news that drives her to embark on a journey with her friend Violeta (Camila Sodi) in Baja California. On the way, they meet an alien who is nicknamed Mark (Luis Gerardo Méndez).

Cast 
 Luis Gerardo Méndez as Mark
 Camila Sodi as Violeta
 Tessa Ía as Emilia
 Andrés Almeida as Jake
 Rodrigo Corea as Empleado en Tienda

References

External links
 

Mexican adventure comedy-drama films
2010s adventure comedy-drama films
2010s Mexican films